Saoud Abdulrazaq (Arabic:سعود عبد الرزاق) (born 23 January 1998) is an Emirati footballer. He currently plays as a midfielder for Shabab Al-Ahli.

Career

Al Ahli
Saoud Abdulrazaq started his career at Al Ahli and is a product of the Al-Ahli's youth system.

Ajman
On 18 January 2017 left Al Ahli and signed with Ajman on loan until the end of the season.

Shabab Al-Ahli
He was playing with Al Ahli and after merging Al Ahli, Al-Shabab and Dubai clubs under the name Shabab Al-Ahli Club he was joined to Shabab Al-Ali. On 21 January 2018, Saoud Abdulrazaq made his professional debut for Shabab Al-Ahli against Ajman in the Pro League.

Khor Fakkan
On 3 February 2020 left Shabab Al-Ali and signed with Khor Fakkan on loan until the end of the season.

External links

References

1998 births
Living people
Emirati footballers
Olympic footballers of the United Arab Emirates
Al Ahli Club (Dubai) players
Ajman Club players
Shabab Al-Ahli Club players
Khor Fakkan Sports Club players
UAE Pro League players
UAE First Division League players
Association football midfielders
Place of birth missing (living people)